Aerfer was an Italian manufacturing company created in 1955 by the merger of IMAM and Officine Ferroviarie Meridionali. The name is a contraction of Costruzioni Aeronautiche e Ferroviarie (Aeronautical and Railway Constructions).

In 1969 it merged with Salmoiraghi and the aviation division of Fiat to create Aeritalia.

The firm is remembered mostly in connection with the development of Italy's first supersonic jet, the Aerfer Sagittario 2.

List of aircraft
SAI.7 (1939) Single propeller engine single-seat racing aircraft
SAI.7T (1943) Single propeller engine two-seat training aircraft
S.7 (1949) Single propeller engine two-seat touring aircraft
Supersette (1951) Single propeller engine two-seat trainer/racing aircraft
Sagittario (1953) Single jet engine adaptation of S.7 aircraft, with wooden wings and tail surfaces
Aerfer Sagittario 2 (1956) All-metal development of Sagittario.  Broke sound barrier.
Aerfer Ariete (1958) Development of Sagittario 2 with additional jet engine for climb and speed
Aerfer Leone (1959) Proposed development of Sagittario 2 with additional rocket engine for climb and speed.  Not built

See also

 List of Italian companies

 
Italian companies established in 1955
1969 disestablishments in Italy
Vehicle manufacturing companies established in 1955
Manufacturing companies disestablished in 1969
Defunct aircraft manufacturers of Italy
Aeritalia